The Three Rivers are the three tidal estuaries in eastern Prince Edward Island, Canada. The water bodies are the Brudenell, Cardigan and Montague rivers, which in 2004 were included on the list of outstanding Canadian Heritage Rivers.

There are several communities situated on the river system including Montague, Cardigan and Georgetown. The Brudenell River Provincial Park is situated on the Brudenell.

See also
List of rivers of Prince Edward Island

References

Rivers of Prince Edward Island